Campanula aghrica (Turkish: Ağrı çanı), the Aghrian bellflower, is a rare flowering plant in the family Campanulaceae. It is native to Turkey and possibly Iran.

Conservation
The species is listed as critically endangered by the IUCN. It is found in one area and its population is continuing to decline. It is under threat by increased urbanisation, effluents from agricultural and forestry, and livestock ranching. It occupies an area less than 10 km2. There are no conservation measures in place.

References

aghrica
Flora of Turkey